The Farm House, also known as the Knapp–Wilson House, is the oldest building on the campus of Iowa State University in Ames, Iowa.  Now a museum open to the general public, this house was built 1861-65 as part of the model farm that eventually became Iowa State.  It was designated a National Historic Landmark in 1964 for its association with agriculturist and teacher Seaman A. Knapp and with U.S. Secretary of Agriculture James Wilson, both of whom lived here while teaching at Iowa State.

Description and history
The Farm House is located near the center of the Iowa State campus, on the west side of Farmhouse Lane.  It is a three-story structure, built primarily out of brick, and set on a stone foundation.  The brick walls, fashioned out of locally sourced clay, were clad in limestone stucco in 1909 because they were crumbling.  The interior is largely reflective of a major remodeling conducted about the same time.  In 1972 the university undertook a major restoration of the building to restore it to its c. 1910 appearance.

The land for what became Iowa State was donated by Story County farmers in 1858 and 1859, and the farm was developed over the following five years, slowed by the ongoing American Civil War.  Iowa Agricultural College opened on the farm in 1869.  In 1880 Seaman Knapp was appointed farm superintendent and professor of practical and experimental agriculture.  Knapp would later become influential in the promotion of modern rice-growing practices in the American South.  In 1891 James Wilson moved into the house, which he would occupy until 1897, when he is offered the post of United States Secretary of Agriculture, a post he would hold for thirteen years.  The house was occupied for much of the first half of the 20th century by Professor Charles F. Curtiss, under whose tenure the house's major alterations were made.  In 1948 the house was converted into a dormitory for women, and its plant was updated again.  In 1970 Dean Floyd Andre, whose family occupied it since 1950, moved out.  Andre's lobbying to preserve the building from demolition succeeded, and it was opened as the Farm House Museum in 1976.

See also
List of National Historic Landmarks in Iowa
National Register of Historic Places listings in Story County, Iowa

References

External links
 Farm House Museum - Iowa State University

National Historic Landmarks in Iowa
Houses on the National Register of Historic Places in Iowa
Iowa State University buildings and structures
Houses completed in 1861
National Register of Historic Places in Story County, Iowa
1861 establishments in Iowa
Houses in Ames, Iowa
Museums in Story County, Iowa
Historic house museums in Iowa
University museums in Iowa
1976 establishments in Iowa
Museums established in 1976